David Demchuk is a Canadian playwright and novelist, who received a longlisted Scotiabank Giller Prize nomination in 2017 for his debut novel The Bone Mother.

Born in Winnipeg, Manitoba, of Ukrainian descent, he moved to Toronto, Ontario in 1984.

His plays have included Rosalie Sings Alone (1985), If Betty Should Rise (1985), Touch (1986), The World We Live On Turns So That the Sun Appears to Rise (1987), Stay (1990), Mattachine (1991), Thieves in the Night (1992) and The Power of Invention. He received a special Dora Mavor Moore Award in 1986 for Touch. In 1992, Touch was included in Making Out, the first anthology of Canadian plays by gay writers, alongside works by Ken Garnhum, Sky Gilbert, Daniel MacIvor, Harry Rintoul and Colin Thomas.

After the mid-1990s, Demchuk stopped writing new plays, concentrating on his work at the Canadian Broadcasting Corporation and on writing scripts for radio, film and television. In 1999, he wrote the radio drama Alice in Cyberspace, a contemporary reworking of Alice in Wonderland which aired for ten episodes on CBC Radio's This Morning. His other radio dramas included Alaska, The Island of Dr. Moreau and The Winter Market. In June 2012, he became a contributing writer for the online magazine Torontoist.

The Bone Mother was published in 2017 by ChiZine Publications. It was the first horror-themed novel ever to receive a nomination for the Giller, an award more commonly associated with conventional literary fiction rather than genre fiction. The book was a shortlisted finalist for the 2018 amazon.ca First Novel Award. His new novel, RED X, published by Strange Light, an imprint of Penguin Random House, was released on August 31, 2021.

References

20th-century Canadian dramatists and playwrights
21st-century Canadian novelists
Canadian male dramatists and playwrights
Canadian male novelists
Canadian horror writers
Canadian LGBT dramatists and playwrights
Canadian LGBT novelists
Canadian gay writers
Writers from Winnipeg
Writers from Toronto
Living people
Canadian radio writers
20th-century Canadian male writers
21st-century Canadian male writers
Canadian Film Centre alumni
Year of birth missing (living people)
21st-century Canadian LGBT people
Canadian people of Ukrainian descent
Gay dramatists and playwrights
Gay novelists